Mario Soares  is a former Indian football player and is the current assistant coach of Indian I-League side Churchill Brothers. During his playing days, Soares played for Salgaocar, Dempo, Churchill Brothers, and represented India internationally.

Playing career
Born in Goa, Soares started his football career as a youth player with Salcette. He started his senior career with Salgaocar, where he won the Federation Cup with the club in 1988. He scored the winning goal in extra-time against Border Security Force as Salgaocar won 1–0. He then went on to play for Dempo and Churchill Brothers later in his career. Soares also represented Goa in the Santosh Trophy and captained the state.

International
Soares represented India at the under-23 level during the 1992 Summer Olympics qualifiers. He scored the only goal for India in their draw to Oman U23. He also represented India internationally at senior level.

Coaching career

Salgaocar
After the departure of Santosh Kashyap from Salgaocar, Soares was put in caretaker charge of the I-League club.

References

Living people
Salgaocar FC players
Dempo SC players
Churchill Brothers FC Goa players
Association football midfielders
Indian footballers
India international footballers
Indian football managers
Salgaocar FC managers
Year of birth missing (living people)
Footballers from Goa